"Battleships" is a song recorded by American rock band Daughtry for their fourth studio album, Baptized (2013). The song was written by Daughtry frontman Chris Daughtry, Sam Hollander, and Martin Johnson, while production was handled by Johnson. It was serviced to hot adult contemporary radio in the US through RCA Records on May 12, 2014, as the third overall single from the album and the second to be promoted in North America. The song debuted at number 38 on the Billboard Adult Pop Songs chart.

Content
The song is a pop rock power ballad that describes a tempestuous, conflict-riddled relationship wherein the narrator and his significant other "love like battleships". As one of the most strongly pop-influenced songs on the album, Chris Daughtry explained to The Hollywood Reporter that he was nervous fans would not take to "Battleships" due to it being "too weird", "too out-there" and/or "too pop", but that he fell in love with the new sound while recording it. The "boom boo-boom boom boo-boom boom boom" hook in the chorus drew attention and some criticism from music critics, who described it as "stunningly weird," "silly," and "crazy".

Music video
A lyric video for the song premiered April 9, 2014. On June 16, Chris Daughtry tweeted a photo with the caption "Things are gettin CRAZY on the #battleships video shoot!!!!", suggesting that an official music video was being filmed at that time. The official music video for "Battleships" premiered August 12, 2014 and features behind-the-scenes footage from the band's summer tour with the Goo Goo Dolls.

Chart performance
"Battleships" debuted at No. 38 on the Billboard Adult Pop Songs chart for the week ending June 21, 2014.

Release history

References

2013 songs
2014 singles
Daughtry (band) songs
RCA Records singles
Songs written by Chris Daughtry
Songs written by Martin Johnson (musician)
Songs written by Sam Hollander
Rock ballads
19 Recordings singles